The Right of the People is a 1986 made-for-TV crime drama movie starring Michael Ontkean, Billy Dee Williams, Jane Kaczmarek, Jamie Smith Jackson and Lisa Jakub, with special guest John Randolph. It debuted on ABC on January 13, 1986. The movie, originally intended as a feature film, was written and directed by Jeffrey Bloom. He wrote the script in outrage over the mass murder during the robbery of a Los Angeles Bob's Big Boy restaurant in 1980. At the network's request, Bloom revised his original script to increase anti-gun viewpoints in the story.

Plot
Christopher Wells is a District Attorney, in fictional St. Lawrence, Kansas. One evening, his wife, Angela, and daughter Katie, are among several people shot to death in a robbery by two ex-cons. Wells, previously opposed to handguns, then pushes for mass arming of his town's citizens for self defense, while his best friend, police officer Mike Trainor, and Angela's friend Alicia remain opposed. Nonetheless, Wells' proposal passes and the movie explores Bloom's visions of an armed public.

References

External links

American legal drama films
Films scored by Billy Goldenberg
ABC network original films
1986 television films
1986 films
1980s crime films
Films set in Kansas
Works about gun politics in the United States
1980s English-language films
Films directed by Jeffrey Bloom
1980s American films